Ozoliņa (Old orthography: O(h)solin(g); masculine: Ozoliņš) is a Latvian surname, derived from the Latvian word for "oak" (ozols). Individuals with the surname include:

Agnese Ozoliņa (born 1979), Latvian swimmer
Elvīra Ozoliņa (born 1939), Soviet javelin thrower
Sinta Ozoliņa-Kovala (born 1988), Latvian javelin thrower

See also 
Ozolin
Ozola

References

Latvian-language feminine surnames